District Selection Committee known as DSC is an entrance examination by the state governments in India for recruitment of teachers.

Eligibility
All the Bachelor of Education or B.Ed graduates are eligible to take the test.

Andhra Pradesh
The AP government takes 20% marks from Teachers Eligibility Test or TET. The government comes out with the notification for the vacant seats every year. and the state government gives 80% weight to DSC and 20% to TET.

In 1998, the government merged Panchayat Raj and Government teacher cadres for uniform selection for all government run schools.

References

External links
 [goo.gl/b4ThXv/ Memorial Day 2015]

 AP DSC Admit Card 2018
 AP DSC Hall Ticket 2018
 AP DSC

Standardised tests in India
Teaching in India